Sørlandsparken is a power center in the municipality of Kristiansand in Agder county, Norway. The park area is located just off the European route E18 highway in the district of Tveit and it includes Norway's largest shopping mall, Sørlandssenteret as well as the Kristiansand Zoo and Amusement Park.

Sørlandssentert

It has over 165 stores.

Kristiansand Zoo and Amusement Park
Kristiansand Zoo and Amusement Park is Norway's largest zoo, it's also an amusement park and waterpark during the summer season.

Transportation
Local city buses goes four times in the hour from Kvadraturen and Flekkerøy through the park, to the zoo and then to IKEA.

E18 goes besides Sørlandsparken.

References 

Geography of Kristiansand